The first season of the Sailor Moon anime series was produced by Toei Animation and directed by Junichi Sato. It was broadcast from March 7, 1992 to February 27, 1993 on TV Asahi. This season adapts the first arc of the Sailor Moon manga series by Naoko Takeuchi, the "Dark Kingdom" arc.

It follows the adventures of Usagi Tsukino and her friends. After the magical cat Luna reveals Usagi's true identity as the titular character, Usagi fights to protect the Earth from the Dark Kingdom, who previously destroyed the ancient Moon Kingdom.

In the 1993 favorite episode listings for Animage, "Loved and Chased! Luna's Worst Day Ever" came in first place, with  "Naru's Cry! Nephrite Dies for Love" coming in third place, "The Sparkling Silver Crystal! The Moon Princess Appears" coming in sixth place, "Memories Return! Usagi and Mamoru's Past" coming in ninth place and "Love for Ami?! A Boy Who Can Predict the Future" coming in eleventh place. The following year, the two-part series finale "The Sailor Warriors Die! The Tragic Final Battle" and "Usagi's Everlasting Wish! A New Reincarnation" took first and second place respectively. Eight DVD compilations were released in Japan between May 21 and July 21, 2002, and the series was later released in a remastered edition in two box-sets from December 11, 2009 to January 21, 2010.

In the English language adaptation of the series by former licensee DIC Entertainment, the season was cut down to 40 episodes and also added an ending segment, "Sailor Says," to teach a moral based on the story that had just been shown. The episodes were first broadcast on YTV in Canada from August 28 to  October 24, 1995, and later had its first-run syndication in the United States from September 11 to November 3, 1995. The first season was later released by ADV Films in a subtitle-only DVD box set in 2003. Eventually, on May 16, 2014, the season was re-licensed for an updated English-language release by Viz Media and they released the season in two uncut DVD and Blu-ray compilations on November 11, 2014 and February 10, 2015 for parts one and two respectively. Hulu began streaming the series in the United States on May 19, 2014, with Tubi TV following suit in Canada on July 15, 2016.

The score was composed by Takanori Arisawa. Three pieces of theme music are used for the episodes; one opening theme and two closing themes. The opening theme for the whole season is "Moonlight Densetsu" performed by the idol group DALI. "Heart Moving", performed by Misae Takamatsu of Sakura Sakura, is used as the ending theme for the first 26 episodes, and "Princess Moon", performed by Ushio Hashimoto, is used for the remainder of the season. DIC Entertainment made an English-language version of the Japanese opening theme for its adaptation.

Several video games were released to promote this season. In 1993, Angel (a subsidiary company of Bandai), published Sailor Moon for Super Nintendo Entertainment System. Also in 1993, Black HCS developed and published a beat 'em up video game called Bishoujo Senshi Sailor Moon: Kessen Dark Kingdom for Sharp X68000. In 1995, Gazelle developed the arcade game Pretty Soldier Sailor Moon, which was published by Banpresto.

Episode list (1992–1993)
{| class="wikitable" style="width:100%; background:#fff;"
|-
! colspan="2" | No.
! rowspan="2" style="border-bottom:6px solid #FFCCFF" | DiC Entertainment dub titleOriginal Japanese and Viz Media titles
! rowspan="2" style="border-bottom:6px solid #FFCCFF" | Episode director(s)
! rowspan="2" style="border-bottom:6px solid #FFCCFF" | Writer(s)
! rowspan="2" style="border-bottom:6px solid #FFCCFF" | Art director(s) 
! rowspan="2" style="border-bottom:6px solid #FFCCFF" | Animation director(s) 
! style="width:15%;" rowspan="2" style="border-bottom:6px solid #FFCCFF" | Original air date
! style="width:15%;"  rowspan="2" style="border-bottom:6px solid #FFCCFF" | English air date 
|- style="border-bottom:6px solid #FFCCFF"
! style="width:5%;"| Orig./Viz
! style="width:5%;"| DiC

|}

Home media

Japanese

VHS

DVD

Blu-ray

English

VHS

United States

United Kingdom

Australia

DVD

United States

United Kingdom

Australia and New Zealand

Blu-ray + DVD combo

North America

Australia and New Zealand

References

1992 Japanese television seasons
1993 Japanese television seasons
Sailor Moon seasons